The Communications and Utilities Regulatory Authority is a statutory board responsible for the regulation of telecommunications and broadcasting in the Isle of Man, and since 2020, certain responsibilities in relation to the gas market.

Ofcom in the United Kingdom is responsible for the regulation of frequency allocation.

The Authority was established as the Communications Commission under the Communications Commission Order 1989.  Since 2001 the Minister for Home Affairs has been chairman of the Commission ex officio.

See also
 Communications on the Isle of Man

References

External links
 Communications and Utilities Regulatory Authority (CURA)

Communications in the Isle of Man
Government of the Isle of Man
1989 establishments in the Isle of Man
Organizations established in 1989